Edward Shenderovich (born January 7, 1976) is an American entrepreneur of Russian origin.  He is a co-founder and former chairman of Knotel, a flexible real estate service, now owned by Newmark Group. He is also the founder of Kite Ventures, a venture investment company behind Darberry (acquired by Groupon), Fyber, Delivery Hero, Plated and Tradeshift.  Prior to Kite Ventures, Shenderovich was a founding executive and the Head of Strategic Development at SUP, a Moscow-based Internet company. He also co-founded Quantum Art, a content management software provider and Merchantry (acquired by Tradeshift).

Business
Shenderovich was born in Leningrad, USSR (now St. Petersburg, Russia) and came to the United States in 1990. He went to Mira Mesa High School and graduated from University of California at Berkeley.

In 2006, Shenderovich became a founding executive of SUP and oversaw the company’s strategic development, including the development of LiveJournal in Russia.

Poetry
Shenderovich writes and publishes poetry in Russian.  He has been published by many Russian journals and included in ‘’Ulysses Released: Contemporary Russian Poets Abroad (In Russian:2004)’’ edited by Dmitry Kuzmin.  In December 2010, Samokat Publishing House released a collection of Shenderovich's children's poems.  A new collection came out in January 2014. Translators of his poetry into English include Richard Wayne Chambliss.

In September 2015, Shenderovich's collection entitled "About One, Two, 3, 4 and 5" received an award at Biennial of Illustration Bratislava.

MiNE
In 2000, Shenderovich became a professor of business modeling at Universitá Cattolica del Sacro Cuore in Piacenza, Italy, and was named Fellow of the MiNE  program in 2004.

References

External links
 Merchantry
 Knotel

1976 births
Russian emigrants to the United States
21st-century Russian poets
Russian male poets
Living people
21st-century male writers
Russian media executives